The 2014–15 Sultan Qaboos Cup is the 42nd edition of the Sultan Qaboos Cup, the premier knockout tournament for football teams in Oman.

The competition began on 9 October 2014 with the qualification round. Fanja SC were the defending champions, having won their ninth title in 2014. On Friday, 22 May 2015, Al-Oruba SC were crowned the champions of the 2014–15 Sultan Qaboos Cup when they defeated fierce domestic rivals, Sur SC 2-0, hence winning the title for fourth time.

Teams
This year the tournament had 38 teams.

 Ahli Sidab Club (Sidab)
 Al-Bashaer Club 
 Al-Hamra SC (Al-Hamra)
 Al-Ittifaq Club
 Al-Ittihad Club (Salalah)
 Al-Kamel Wa Al-Wafi SC 
 Al-Khabourah SC (Al-Khabourah)
 Al-Mudhaibi Club (Mudhaibi)
 Al-Musannah SC (Al-Musannah)
 Al-Nahda Club (Al-Buraimi)
 Al-Nasr S.C.S.C. (Salalah)
 Al-Oruba SC (Sur)
 Al-Rustaq SC (Rustaq)
 Al-Salam SC (Sohar)
 Al-Seeb Club (Al-Seeb)
 Al-Shabab Club (Seeb)
 Al-Suwaiq Club (Suwaiq
 Al-Tali'aa SC (Sur)
 Al-Wahda SC (Sur)
 Bahla Club (Bahla)
 Bidia SC (Bidiya)
 Bowsher Club (Bowsher)
 Dhofar S.C.S.C. (Salalah)
 Dibba Club (Dibba Al-Baya)
 Fanja SC (Fanja)
 Ibri Club (Ibri)
 Ja'lan SC (Jalan Bani Bu Ali)
 Khasab SC (Khasab)
 Madha SC  (Madha)
 Masirah SC (Majees)
 Majees SC (Majees)
 Mirbat SC (Mirbat)
 Muscat Club (Muscat)
 Nizwa Club (Nizwa)
 Oman Club (Muscat)
 Quriyat Club (Quriyat)
 Saham SC (Saham)
 Salalah SC (Salalah)
 Samail SC (Samail)
 Sohar SC (Sohar)
 Sur SC (Sur)
 Yanqul SC (Yanqul)

Qualification round
10 teams played a knockout tie. 5 ties were played over one leg. The first match was played between Dibba Club and Quriyat Club on 9 October 2014. Dibba Club, Bahla Club, Yanqul SC, Ja'lan SC and Madha SC advanced to the Round of 32 after winning their respective ties.

Round of 32
The draw for the round of 32 was held on 8 November 2014. 32 teams played a knockout tie. 16 ties were played over one leg. The first match played was between Al-Kamel wa Al-Wafi SC and Al-Ittihad Club on 1 December 2014. 16 teams advanced to the Round of 16.

Round of 16
16 teams played a knockout tie. 8 ties were played over one leg. The first match was played between Sur SC and Fanja SC on 15 December 2014. The draw for the round of 32 was held on 8 December 2014. 8 teams advanced to the Quarterfinals.

Quarter-finals
8 teams will play a knockout tie. 4 ties were played over two legs. The first match will be played between Al-Seeb Club and Ahli Sidab Club on 11 March 2015. The draw for the round of 32 was held on 24 February 2015. 4 teams will advance to the Semi-finals.

First leg

Second leg

Semifinals
4 teams played a knockout tie. 2 ties were played over two legs. The first match was played between Al-Seeb Club and Sur SC on 19 April 2015.

1st Legs

2nd Legs

Finals

Season statistics

Top scorers

Top Omani Scorers

See also
2014–15 Oman Professional League Cup
2014–15 Oman First Division League

References

External links
Oman Sultan Cup 2014-2015 - Goalzz.com

Sultan Qaboos Cup seasons
Cup
Oman